Niphograpta is a genus of moths of the family Crambidae. It contains only one species, the water hyacinth moth (Niphograpta albiguttalis). It is native to the Amazon basin, but has been introduced in North America (where it is found from Florida, along the gulf coast to Louisiana and Texas), Africa and Australia (where it is found in Queensland and New South Wales) to control the spread of water hyacinth.

The forewings are golden yellow speckled with grey. The hindwings are bright yellow with a prominent black discal spot.

The larvae feed on Eichhornia crassipes. They bore in the stems and leaf buds of their host plant. First instar larvae have a brown body with a dark brown to black head. Later instars are cream coloured with scattered dark brown spots and a dark orange head.

References

Spilomelinae
Monotypic moth genera
Moths of South America
Crambidae genera
Taxa named by William Warren (entomologist)